CHAOS: Charles Manson, the CIA, and the Secret History of the Sixties is a 2019 non-fiction book written by Tom O'Neill with . The book presents O'Neill's research into the background and motives for the Tate–LaBianca murders committed by the Manson Family in 1969. O'Neill questions the Helter Skelter scenario argued by lead prosecutor Vincent Bugliosi in the trials and in his book Helter Skelter (1974). The book's title is a reference to the covert CIA program Operation CHAOS.

Background
In 1999, entertainment reporter Tom O'Neill accepted a three-month assignment from the film magazine Premiere to write about how the Tate–LaBianca murders changed Hollywood. O'Neill missed his deadline but continued to investigate the murders. CHAOS is the product of twenty years of meticulous research, hundreds of interviews, and falling-outs with publishers that led to financial and legal repercussions for O'Neill.

Reception
Publishers Weekly wrote that "True crime fans will be enthralled."  The Guardians Peter Conrad wrote, "As [O'Neill] admits, the loose ends are still not tied up and with so many of the culprits dead they probably never will be. O’Neill's intricately sinister 'secret history' often sounds incredible; that doesn’t mean that it’s not all true." Writing in the Los Angeles Times, Stephen Phillips deemed that O'Neill did "yeoman's work filling out an aging narrative straitjacketed by the exigencies of its author’s legal strategy. " Greg King of The Washington Post wrote, "There’s plenty of new information that makes Chaos a worthwhile addition to the canon of Manson literature, even if it ends without a unified theory of the crimes and their motivations.".

In a mixed review, Kirkus Reviews called the book "overlong", praising "the author's confessions of the many dead ends and blank spots he encountered" but largely criticizing O'Neill for exploring too many theories. Tony Allen-Mills of The Sunday Times felt that the early chapters of the book "do a convincing job picking out the flaws in Bugliosi's case, but the wheels start to come off when O'Neill begins searching for alternative explanations."

Film adaptation
On July 19, 2019, Variety reported that Amazon Studios purchased the film rights to the book. Before CHAOS was published, an adaptation of O'Neill's story was originally in development by Errol Morris in collaboration with Netflix but O'Neill backed out of the project over creative differences.

References

External links
 CHAOS on Little, Brown and Company's website

2019 non-fiction books
Debut books
Collaborative non-fiction books
Little, Brown and Company books
Manson Family
Non-fiction books about murders in the United States
Non-fiction books about criminals
Non-fiction books about the Central Intelligence Agency
Books about the Federal Bureau of Investigation
Works about Project MKUltra
Investigative journalism